DC Books is a publisher in Kerala publisher of books in Malayalam, and one of the  publishers in India . It also operates one of the largest book store chains in India, with a network of over 45 bookshops under the DC Books and Current Books brands as well as more than 50 agencies in Kerala.

DC Books
DC Books is a publisher and bookseller with headquarters in Kottayam, Kerala, India. It published over 6500 titles, mainly literature in Malayalam, but also including children's literature, poetry, reference, biography, self-help, yoga, management titles, and foreign translations. 

DC Media, is the media division of DC Books. DC Media publishes 5 magazines namely, Education Insider, Asia's leading magazine on education, Future Medicine, magazine on Asian medical industry and Emerging Kerala, Kerala's fastest growing magazine on business, economy and society, Money Indices and Travel and Flavors.
DC Books was founded in 1974 by Dominic Chacko Kizhakemuri, known as D. C. Kizhakemuri or just DC amongst literary Kerala. At that time, DC was Secretary of the Sahithya Pravarthaka Co-operative Society, a cooperative venture of Malayalam writers. The society helped writers with the business and publishing details and instituted a standard royalty of 30-40%, as well as the system of an 'advance' payment for their books, financially enabling them to devote themselves to writing full-time. When he turned his attention to founding DC Books, DC began promoting and creating markets for its books by organizing festivals, clubs, and pre-publication subscriptions, and installment schemes. Their successful bookclub scheme allows buyers to build a library of their own by buying books on installments. In 1977, Current Books became its sister concern. In 2001, DC Books launched dcbooks.com, an Indian local language bookstore with over 4,000 titles. In 2004, DC Books partnered with Corner Books to open a New Delhi branch for Keralites in Delhi.

DC Books is the publisher of several translation dictionaries used by professionals and South Asian Linguists, such as their:
 "English-English-Malayalam dictionary" by T. Ramalingam Pillai 
 Malayalam English Dictionary by M. Varier, et al.

Imprints
DC Books is the parent company of the following imprints: 
DC Books: non-fiction, literature, translations, and reference books
Kairali Mudralayam: popular fiction, including children's books and translations
Kairali Children's Book Trust: produces children's literature and gives annual awards for best works in Malayalam
Mango Books: Children's imprint in English. Winner of Awards for Excellence (2014) constituted by the Federation of Indian Publishers.

Achievements
 In 2004 alone, won five awards in the General, Reference, Paperback, House Magazine, and Catalogues categories for their: Malayalam Encyclopedia, Thesaurus, Charithrakaandom, Pachakuthira.
 In 2004 alone, D.C. Books brought out 531 titles, the maximum number among Indian publishers
 DC Books was the first publishers/book sellers in India to get ISO 9000 Certification.

Controversy
In 2004, DC Books published a translated version of Britannica Concise Encyclopædia into Malayalam in the name Britannica Malayalam Encyclopedia. The book won an award from the Federation of Indian Publishers in 2004.

A Consumer Court banned the sale of the book because it was found to be an erroneous reference with many factual errors. The court also found that there was unfair trade practice on the part of the publishers, which are DC Books, Kerala and Encyclopædia Britannica India Pvt.Ltd, a subsidiary of Encyclopædia Britannica Inc.

DC Books Clubs and Festivals
The DC International Book Fair offers book releases and exhibitions. The Fair also features youth contests in Spot Poetry Writing, English Quiz, Malayalam Quiz, Street Drama - Malayalam, Declamation, Pen A Story, Special Schools Only, Film Appreciation, English Reading, Malayalam Reading, Painting, and Readers Theatre.

Headquarters
The headquarters of DC Books on Good Shepherd Street in Kottayam houses an art gallery, hosting exhibits of modern and traditional paintings and sculptures.

DC Media

DC Media, the media wing of DC Books was launched in January 2011. DC Media publishes Education Insider, a pan-Asian magazine for the education sector; Future Medicine, a global magazine on health and medicine;Emerging Kerala (Magazine), a magazine which focuses on the socio-economic development of Kerala; and Pachakuthira, a magazine which intervenes into the socio-political space.

References

Book publishing companies of India
Bookstores of India
Companies based in Kottayam
Publishing companies established in 1974
Retail companies established in 1974
Indian companies established in 1974
1974 establishments in Kerala